Thomas Simon Cool, a Dutch historical and genre painter, was born at the Hague on 12 December 1831. He studied at the Hague Academy under J. E. J. van den Berg, and Baron Leys, and first distinguished himself by his 'Atala,' exhibited in 1853. He resided in Paris from 1857 to 1860, and in Antwerp from 1861 to 1865, then in Breda as a teacher from 1866 to 1870. He died at Dordrecht on 29 August 1870. Also known for "Zelfpotret", a self-portrait, "Boy and Dog in Stable" also known as "A Child feeding a dog", "A peasant girl harvesting", and "Child with Cat (1865)"

References

Attribution:
 

1831 births
1870 deaths
Artists from The Hague
Dutch genre painters
Royal Academy of Art, The Hague alumni
19th-century Dutch painters
Dutch male painters
19th-century Dutch male artists